
Puławy County is a unit of territorial administration and local government (powiat) in Lublin Voivodeship, eastern Poland. It was first established in 1867, but its current borders were established on January 1, 1999, as a result of the Polish local government reforms passed in 1998.

In 2019, its total population was 113,441, including 47,634 in Puławy, 3,749 in Nałęczów, 2,563 in Kazimierz Dolny and a rural population of 59,495.

Neighbouring counties
Puławy County is bordered by Ryki County to the north, Lubartów County and Lublin County to the east, Opole Lubelskie County to the south, Zwoleń County to the west, and Kozienice County to the north-west.

Administrative division
The county is subdivided into 11 gminas (one urban, two urban-rural and eight rural). These are listed in the following table, in descending order of population.

References

 
Land counties of Lublin Voivodeship